CECHS may refer to:
 Challenge Early College High School - Houston, Texas
 Coahoma Early College High School - Coahoma County, Mississippi